The Nickelodeon sitcom iCarly (2007–2012) centers around Carly Shay, who creates her own web show with her best friends Sam and Freddie. The series stars Miranda Cosgrove as Carly, Jennette McCurdy as Sam, Nathan Kress as Freddie, Jerry Trainor as Spencer, and Noah Munck as Gibby. iCarly was created by Dan Schneider, who also serves as executive producer. Two television films, iGo to Japan and iParty with Victorious, a crossover with Victorious, were released in 2008 and 2011 respectively. A joint spin-off with Victorious, titled Sam & Cat, starring McCurdy and Ariana Grande as Cat Valentine, aired on Nickelodeon from 2013 to 2014. 

In 2021, a revival of the series was released for Paramount+, with Cosgrove, Kress, and Trainor continuing their roles, and also starring Laci Mosley as Carly's best friend Harper and Jaidyn Triplett as Freddie's stepdaughter Millicent. The series was developed by Ali Schouten without Schneider's involvement, who also serves as executive producer alongside Cosgrove.

Main characters

Overview

Carly Shay
Carly Shay (Miranda Cosgrove) starts as a 13-year-old girl who lives with her older brother, Spencer Shay, in Seattle, Washington. They live in the Bushwell Plaza apartment building.

In "iPilot", Carly takes the blame for one of Sam's pranks and has to oversee people who want to be in the school's talent show as punishment. When Carly, Sam, and Freddie's suggestions are completely ignored, they decide to make a web show named iCarly upon Freddie's suggestion, with the 'i' standing for 'Internet' and Carly's name since she will be the host of the show.

In the 2021 revival, it is revealed that Carly hosted QVC whilst in Italy and hosted college radio while studying theater and media studies. By the events of the reboot, she is sharing an apartment in Seattle with her new friend Harper. After failed attempts to start an internet channel with romantic interests, she decides to restart her iCarly webshow, with Freddie and Spencer assisting her.

Sam Puckett
Samantha "Sam" Puckett (Jennette McCurdy) is Carly Shay's best friend, and in later episodes is Freddie Benson's ex-girlfriend. She co-hosts the iCarly webshow with Carly, and also handles the sound effect remote control. Sam has an identical twin sister named Melanie. Their mother is Pam Puckett (Jane Lynch). Sam also stated she and her twin sister Melanie were born on a bus due to poor planning by their mother.

In the series finale, "iGoodbye", Sam and Carly take a break from their web show while Carly moves to Italy. Sam becomes a lead character in the spin-off series Sam & Cat, in which she moves to Los Angeles and becomes friends with Cat Valentine (a character originally from Victorious) after rescuing her from a garbage truck.

in the 2021 revival, it's revealed that Sam had left Los Angeles and joined a biker gang that travels the country.

Freddie Benson
Fredward "Freddie" Benson (Nathan Kress) is the technical producer for the web-show iCarly which stars his friends Carly Shay and Sam Puckett. He is often the scapegoat when it comes to Sam's bad ideas. It is revealed that he has had a crush on Carly since the 6th grade, but Carly generally regards him as one of her best friends. However, in "iSaved Your Life", Carly falls for him after he saves her from getting run over by a taco truck. Freddie breaks up with her and says that if Carly still loves him and would still want to be his girlfriend when "the whole hero thing dies down", he would "be very psyched about it". At the end of this episode, Freddie is shown in the elevator asking himself, "What did I do?"

In the 2021 revival, it is revealed that in the nine years since they were last together, Freddie had been involved in a failed tech start-up, had two failed marriages, and was forced to move back in with his mother along with his adopted stepdaughter Millicent.

Spencer Shay
Spencer Shay (Jerry Trainor) is Carly's childish, hyperactive, older brother. When Carly's dad was called overseas, she went to live with Spencer, who turned their loft into both a workspace and gallery for his wacky sculptures. Spencer is off-beat and rarely acts his age but acts responsibly and seriously when necessary. Though often spontaneous and unreliable, Spencer has been shown as being extremely protective of Carly, especially in episodes such as "iQuit iCarly", when he sees Carly about to fall off a window washer platform and sprints to her rescue, and "iLook Alike", when he would not approve her going to a mixed martial arts fight, and "iDate a Bad Boy", when he adamantly disapproved of Carly dating Griffin. 

In the 2021 revival, it is revealed that Spencer became a millionaire after one of his sculptures was accidentally set on fire and inadvertently seen by the art audience as a political statement. He has since remodeled his apartment, but kept the third floor intact, allowing Carly and Freddie to use it to restart their webshow.

Gibby
Orenthal Cornelius "Gibby" Gibson (Noah Munck) is a friend and classmate of Carly and Sam. Due to his odd personality and chubby appearance, he is an outcast at school, although he does have a few friends. He used to be known for taking off his shirt in almost all episodes he appeared in. After season 4, he has not taken his shirt off and stated in "iStill Psycho" that he takes it off "less frequently now". He often appears on iCarly to assist Carly, Sam, and Freddie. Gibby started off as an occasional recurring character of the show, but was promoted to a main character by season 4. Gibby has a little brother named Guppy, played by Munck's younger brother. In "iMove Out", he has a pet bulldog named Grubbles. Gibby also has a pet cat which he apparently likes to film, mentioned by his girlfriend Tasha in "iEnrage Gibby". A running gag in many episodes usually has many characters yelling "Gibby!" to him, either when they are aggravated or annoyed by him. Since becoming a series regular, Gibby often announces his presence upon entering a room by saying his own name in a deepened voice: "Gibbeh!" It was revealed in the episode, "iStill Psycho", that his birth name is Orenthal Gibson.

Harper
Harper Bettencourt (Laci Mosley) is Carly's new best friend and roommate. She is an aspiring fashion designer and works as a barista at Skybucks Coffee Bar after her family lost their fortune.

Following Mosley's casting in March 2021, Mosley has been the target of racist attacks from fans who saw her as a "replacement" for Jennette McCurdy's Sam Puckett. Writer Franchesca Ramsey tweeted in response, "[Mosley]'s character Harper isn't replacing Sam [McCurdy's character from the original].

Millicent
Millicent Mitchell (Jaidyn Triplett) is Freddie's snarky and social media-obsessed adopted daughter. Freddie shares custody of her with her mother, Gwen.

Recurring characters

Marissa Benson
Marissa Benson (Mary Scheer) is Freddie's stereotypically overprotective, and sensitive safe-cautious mom, first appearing in "iWanna Stay with Spencer". She is neurotic, worried about Freddie getting hurt or having relationships with girls, and constantly treats her son, as well as Spencer, like a child. She wanted Carly to love Freddie in "iWill Date Freddie", but later came to resent her for changing Freddie's "boy chemistry". Marissa constantly embarrasses Freddie in public, often by making him follow all of her strange rules. In the revival, she bonds well with her adopted granddaughter Millicent.

Lewbert
Lewbert Sline (Jeremy Rowley) is the rude and psychotic doorman of Carly's apartment. He has a large, noticeable wart on his left cheek. In "iFind Lewbert's Lost Love", he reveals that the wart developed from stress caused by his abusive ex-girlfriend, Marta. Her over-obsessiveness caused Lewbert to take her on a cruise, jump overboard, swim to shore, change his last name, lose his good looks, lose his job as a supermodel, move to Seattle, and essentially lose his mind. He is later sent to jail for 6 months for smacking a police officer on the face and "admitting" that he was the one who was stealing TV remotes from the apartments so he can escape Marta. In the 2021 revival, it is revealed that a month after Carly left for Italy, Lewbert had abruptly left the apartment building, and spent 9 years trying to build a plan to get back at the Carly gang by going to law school and becoming a lawyer in order to sue them for $2.4 million.

T-Bo
Terrence "T-Bo" Bo (BooG!e) is the manager at the Groovy Smoothie. He often hassles his customers to buy random foods, such as bagels, bell peppers, doughnuts and pickles, alongside smoothies. These foods are always skewered on a stick. T-Bo says he has a degree in "Smoothology". He is a close friend of Carly, Spencer, and the rest of the gang.

Socko

Socko is Spencer's longtime friend since high school, who is mentioned in several episodes but never seen in person. He is known for making all of Spencer's brightly colored, light-up socks, first seen in "iWant More Viewers". He often commissions Spencer to make sculptures for his business.

Nevel Papperman
Nevel Amadeus Papperman (Reed Alexander) is one of the most recurring villains in the iCarly series, running the popular review website Nevelocity.com and tending to have a "posh" personality which includes dressing formally all the time. First appearing in "iNevel", Nevel reveals to have a crush on Carly and initially offered to interview her in order to get close to her, but Carly resisted his romantic advances, eventually retaliating by angrily smearing tapenade on his face after he kissed her. He has since made it his goal to destroy the iCarly gang.

Chuck
Chuck Chambers (Ryan Ochoa) first made an appearance in "iHurt Lewbert", when playing racquetball in the lobby, which Spencer got him grounded by his father for two days. Later in the episode, when Spencer is out of earshot, he uses the CB radio that Spencer is using to upset two truckers and gives the truckers the location so that they can come and get Spencer. Since then, Chuck and Spencer became rivals and have clashed on several more occasions, usually ending with Spencer winning and Chuck getting in trouble with his father. He later re-appears in the reboot series' second season's second episode "iObject, Lewbert!", where he commits perjury under the authorities' noses by falsely testifying against Carly and Spencer in court.

Guppy
Guppy Gibson (Ethan Munck) is Gibby's younger brother. He first appears in "iPsycho" when he visits Gibby, who is staying with Spencer and Carly. Guppy later frees the iCarly gang from a recording booth while Gibby distracts Nora, the girl who trapped the iCarly gang. Guppy is played by Noah Munck's real-life brother, Ethan.

Charlotte
Charlotte Gibson (Deena Dill) is Gibby and Guppy's mother. She dates Spencer in "iFix a Pop Star", but he breaks up with her because he thinks she looks too much like her son Gibby, which makes her become aware of his resemblance to Carly.

Maeve
Maeve (Lyric Lewis) is Harper's cousin who disappeared four years prior to the beginning of the revival series and had been presumed kidnapped. She resurfaces in the episode "iTake a Girl's Trip" to spend time with Harper. However, she meets Spencer and inadvertently upsets Harper by dating him and choosing to move into his apartment while she looks for a place of her own.

Ridgeway Junior High School

Faculty
Principal Ted Franklin (Tim Russ) is the school principal, who is fond of Carly and Freddie. Principal Franklin is sometimes fond of Sam because he loves iCarly.

Miss Francine Briggs (Mindy Sterling) is a mean English teacher that Carly and her friends like to tease. She is also one of Spencer's former teachers.

Mr. Howard (David St. James) is a math teacher and detention moderator with an extremely unpleasant personality. He is a vindictive, hateful, perpetually angry person that hates practically everything – laughter, children, and even his wife. Everyone at Ridgeway, including Carly and her friends as well as Principal Franklin, dislike him, and the feeling is mutual.

Mr. Devlin (Adrian Neil) is a British history teacher at Ridgeway Middle School. According to Freddie, he is snotty and very strict to his students.

Miss Lauren Ackerman (Jessica Makinson) is an emotionally unstable, verbally abusive history teacher at Ridgeway. She appears in the episode "iHave A Lovesick Teacher," where she dates Spencer. While dating Spencer, she is kind and giddy.

Mr. Stern (Joseph Buttler) is a teacher at Ridgeway Middle School. He is very strict and usually seen coming out of the teacher's lounge when there is an emergency.

Mr. Henning (Andrew Hill Newman) is a hippie science teacher at Ridgeway Middle School. Spencer once had him as a science teacher but complained that Henning was like a freaky weirdo and smelled like rotting wood.

Superintendent Harold Gorman (Weston Blakesley) is the Superintendent of Ridgeway Middle School and Principal Franklin's boss. He appeared in "iHave My Principals".

Students
Missy Robinson (Haley Ramm) was Carly's best friend, because both of their fathers were stationed at the same naval base at Seal Beach when they were seven, before Carly met Sam.

Valerie (Carly Bondar) was Freddie's girlfriend in "iWill Date Freddie" but was actually using him as help in creating her own webshow so that it could overshadow iCarly.

Jeremy (Nathan Pearson) is a sickly boy who is known as "Germy" because he has been constantly sneezing and coughing since first grade. Like Freddie, he is also fascinated with electronics, and was the tech-producer and cameraman for iCarly.

Wendy (Mary Ann Springer) is one of Carly and the gang's friends on the show.

Wesley (Colin Spencer [Season 1], Victor Kelso [Season 7]) is one of Freddie's friends. 

Ripoff Rodney (Christopher David III) is a student at Ridgeway who sells random items at high prices.

Duke Lubberman (Doug Brochu) is an aggressive student in Ridgeway who likes to wrestle.

Jocelyn (Cynthia Dallas) is a rude senior who appears in "iMake Sam Girlier".

Jonah (Aaron Albert) was Sam's boyfriend in "iHate Sam's Boyfriend".

Jake Krandl (Austin Butler) is Carly's first love interest in "iLike Jake". Almost every other girl in Carly's school has a crush on Jake. 

Magic Malika (Skyler Day) only appeared in "iSpeed Date" as a date for Freddie to the Girls' Choice dance. She had a very odd personality and is a skilled magician.

Pete (Graham Patrick Martin) is Sam's love interest in "iMake Sam Girlier".

Shane (James Maslow) was Carly and Sam's crush in "iSaw Him First", who Carly and Sam found very attractive, but he falls down an elevator shaft.

Shannon Mitchell (Annamarie Kenoyer) was Gibby's crush in "iWin a Date". In turn, she had a major crush on Freddie, but Freddie wanted nothing to do with her.

Shawn (Matthew Moy) is a friend of Carly, Sam, and Freddie who is also part of the Mathletes club with Freddie in "iMeet Fred".

Simon Kendall (Simon Bernal) was a boy who could squirt milk out of his eye. He appeared in "iPilot" and "iCarly Awards".

Rueben (Gary Pease) was Gibby's best friend who had a crush on Sam since he first saw her.

Minor characters
Officer Carl (Christopher Michael) is a police officer that appeared in "iWant More Viewers" and "iMove Out".

Aspartamay (Jack Black) is Spencer's online video game rival in "iStart a Fan War". He and Spencer come face-to-face at Webicon.

Pam Puckett (Jane Lynch) is the mother of Sam Puckett and her sister Melanie. Pam appears only in "iSam's Mom". She was frequently mentioned throughout the first three seasons, but had never been seen in person.

Krustacia (Irina Voronina) is Spencer's date in the episode "iSell Penny Tees". She is a foreign woman from Uzbekistan. She speaks no English, so Spencer has to use hand motions to communicate with her.

Gordon Birch (J. D. Walsh) and Jodi Flooger (Rakefet Abergel) are a couple from Milwaukee, Wisconsin, who only appear in the episode "iDo".

Harper (Leon Thomas III) is the leader of the band that played in "iCarly Saves TV". He played the piano on the TV show and sang a song on guitar on the webshow.

Greg Horvath (Kevin Symons) is the CEO of the DAKA Shoe Company (also mentioned in Drake & Josh) in "iPromote Techfoots".

Mr. Galini was the Italian owner of Galini's Pie Shop, featured in "iPie". 

Mario (Jim Pirri) is an Italian immigrant friend of Mr. Galini who works at Galini's pie shop. He told Carly and the gang that Mr. Galini died. His only appearance was in "iPie".

Trudy Galini (Wendy Haines) is the granddaughter of Mr. Galini, seen in the episode "iPie". She is very awkward and weird, and seems to lead a depressing life.

Shelby Marx (Victoria Justice) appears only in "iFight Shelby Marx". She is the youngest champion in the CFC and becomes a friend of Carly, Sam and Freddie.

Ginger Fox (Betsy Rue) only appears in "iFix a Popstar". She is a parody of singer Britney Spears. She was once a Pop Music Award-winner

Shadow Hammer (Aaron Aguilera) is a criminal who appears in "iSam's Mom".

Chip Chambers (Jacob Bertrand) is the more menacing younger brother of Chuck Chambers.

Mrs. Papperman (Wendy Braun) is Nevel's mother. She is only seen in "iNevel," in which she forced Nevel to remove a bad review he wrote about iCarly.

The Dorfmans (Dalton O'Dell, Shane Partlow, Casey Williams, and Stephanie C. Allen) are Carly's dorky cousins whom she despises due to them being uncontrollably annoying.

Kyoko and Yuki (Ally Maki and Harry Shum, Jr.) are two Japanese webstars whom iCarly competed against in iGo to Japan. They attempted to ruin iCarly's chances of winning the iWeb Awards by stranding them in the middle of nowhere.

Mystery Girl is a little girl (Anna Clark) who appears in "iSpace Out". She arrives at Spencer and Carly's apartment while Carly is away at space camp.

Gunsmoke (Anthony Vitale) is a bodyguard who appears in "iSam's Mom". Mrs. Benson hires him to protect Freddie when she worries about the Shadow Hammer.

Marta Trundel (Kit Pongetti) is Lewbert's former girlfriend. Carly, Sam, and Freddie try to reunite Marta and Lewbert to put an end to Lewbert's attitude in "iFind Lewbert's Lost Love", only to find out that they broke up after 5 weeks of dating because of Marta's obsessiveness and that she is the presumed cause of Lewbert becoming an irritable person.

Wade Collins (Alex Schemmer) is a British-Canadian aspiring singer and a shouter who refers to Americans as "hobknockers".

Doug Toder (Daniel Samonas) is Spencer's old archrival who only appears in "iFence". He challenged Freddie to a fencing competition, only to be beaten by him and Ms. Benson.

Veronica (Valerie Azlynn) was Spencer's date in "iMake Sam Girlier", but their relationship happened only because she liked his tuxedo. She returns in "iEnrage Gibby", to express condolence when she thinks Spencer is dead.

Detective Stuart 'Spanky' Stimbler (Ryan Bollman) is a childhood bully of Spencer who only appears in "iStakeout". His nickname "Spanky" refers to the fact that he likes to spank unsuspecting people as a joke.

Tasha (Emily Ratajkowski) is Gibby's girlfriend. She had a minor role in "iSpeed Date" and a major role in "iEnrage Gibby".

Harry Joyner (Oliver Muirhead) is Spencer's favorite sculptor who appears in "iHeart Art". According to Joyner, he has made a sculpture out of every substance known to man, and when he met Spencer for the first time, he was planning to make a human sculpture.

Amber Tate (Rachel G. Fox) is a spoiled child actress that appears in "iCarly Saves TV", in which she is rude to the iCarly gang. She has a small dog who vomits on Freddie.

Granddad Shay (Greg Mullavey) is a lawyer and Carly and Spencer's paternal grandfather who lives in Yakima, Washington.

Col. Steven Shay (David Chisum) is Carly and Spencer's father who is a Colonel in the United States Air Force. He has appeared in a few episodes, but has mostly been stationed on a base in Italy. In the final episode, Carly left Seattle to stay with him in Italy.

Amanda "Mandy" Valdez (Aria Wallace) is an obsessed fan of iCarly and only appears in "iAm Your Biggest Fan" and "iWant My Website Back".

Nora Dershlit (Danielle Morrow) is a psychotic and lonely social outcast who is a crazy fan of iCarly and has no friends.

Griffin (Drew Roy) is a bad boy that Carly dates in "iDate a Bad Boy". Griffin steals Spencer's motorcycle and Spencer takes him under his wing.

Sasha Striker (Lorena York) is the world's best Pak-Rat (parody of Pac-Man) player who appeared in "iStage an Intervention".

Jackson Colt (Terrell Lee) is a top 10 MMA fighter and appears only in "iLook Alike".

Hazel (Sherry Weston) is an elderly woman that Gibby met while riding down the street on his bike in "iDo". Once he sees her, he asks her if she can help him retrieve a five-dollar bill that he spotted in a tree. She accepts the offer, but only after Gibby promises her they will go get coffee afterwards. She helps him get the bill by letting him get on her shoulders. After retrieving the bill, she falls down and Gibby drives off and forgets about her. She is last seen on the ground mumbling "Are we still going to get coffee?".

Cal (Jake Siegel) was Carly's assistant in "iGo Nuclear". He was helping her with a school science project for her teacher, Mr. Henning. Cal was actually a criminal because he built illegal nuclear projects using black market uranium. His criminal history is revealed at the end of the episode.

Mitch (Danny Woodburn) appears in "iChristmas". He is the guardian angel who granted Carly's wish for Spencer to become normal.

 (Jennette McCurdy) is Sam's identical twin sister who appears in "iTwins". According to Sam, she is a straight "A" student, follows all the rules, and goes to a fancy boarding school in Blandale, Vermont.

Fleck and Dave (Daven Wilson and Joey Luthman) are two teenage boys who cohost a web show and appear in "iQuit iCarly". The two are good friends but have very different opinions.

Cort and Ashley (Daniel Booko and Teresa Castillo) are two teenagers hired as interns in the episode "iHire An Idiot".

Steven Carson (Cameron Stewart) is Carly and Tori's ex-boyfriend on "iParty with Victorious".

Goopy Gilbert (Jeremy Dozier) is an extreme Seddie fan best known for shouting "SEDDIE!" He is first seen in "iStart a Fanwar" as a Seddier in the crowd. In "iLost My Mind", he is the second video chatter debating whether or not Sam and Freddie should be together. He loves spaghetti and his bedroom is decorated with pictures of Sam and Freddie.

Guest appearances

References 

Characters
Lists of American sitcom television characters
Lists of Nickelodeon television series characters